Ram Jaipal Singh Yadav was an Indian politician and former Deputy Chief Minister of Bihar state. He was a seven-time member of Bihar Legislative Assembly from Sonpur and Bakhtiarpur constituencies.

Early life and family
Ram Jaipal Singh Yadav was born in Saran district, Bihar, British India.

Political career
Ram Jaipal Singh Yadav first assembly election elected as PSP candidate in 1957 from Garkha Legislative Assembly. 

Yadav was elected Member of Bihar Legislative Assembly from Sonpur constituency from 1967 to 1977 and from 1981 to 1995 from Bakhtiarpur as a member of Indian National Congress.

Electoral Record
In 1977 Devendra Prasad Yadav resigned from the Bihar Vidhan Sabha and paved the way for Karpoori Thakur to contest the Phulparas constituency by-election. Thakur won by the margin of 65000 votes, defeating Ram Jaipal Singh Yadav of Indian National Congress.

In Memory
 Ram Jaipal Singh Yadav College established on 5 July 1971 is one of the leading institutions of higher learning and is a constituent to the Jai Prakash University, Chapra Bihar.

References

Bihar MLAs 1967–1969
Bihar MLAs 1969–1972
Bihar MLAs 1972–1977
Bihar MLAs 1980–1985
Bihar MLAs 1985–1990
Bihar MLAs 1990–1995
Deputy Chief Ministers of Bihar
State cabinet ministers of Bihar
People from Saran district
People from Patna district
People from Patna
Indian National Congress politicians from Bihar